Daniel Breaker (born June 2, 1980) is an American actor and comedian. He is best known for playing Donkey in Shrek The Musical.

Career
Beginning his career in 2002, immediately after graduating from Juilliard, Breaker has performed in Off-Broadway, London, and U.S. regional theatre productions. He performed in five plays at the Shakespeare Theatre in Washington D.C. His first major role was the Youth, protagonist of the Off-Broadway premiere of Passing Strange, for which he won an Obie Award in 2008. He was then nominated for a Tony Award for the show's Broadway transfer, in which he again played the Youth; he also played this role in Spike Lee's filmed version of the musical.

Breaker has also been a guest star on TV.

One of his most recognizable roles was Donkey in the original Broadway production of Shrek The Musical, which ran from November 2008 through January 2010. He starred alongside long-time Broadway stars Brian d'Arcy James, Sutton Foster, John Tartaglia, and Christopher Sieber. For his portrayal, Breaker earned a Drama Desk Award nomination for Outstanding Actor in a Musical. His voice can be heard on the original cast recording of the show.

He has also appeared in the plays Well and Cymbeline.

In 2009, he co-hosted the Obie Awards.

Breaker previously played Mafala Hatimbi in The Book of Mormon on Broadway. He also appeared as the King of Navarre in The Public Theater's Shakespeare in the Park production of the Love's Labour's Lost musical. He played Aaron Burr in Hamilton in Chicago and joined the musical's Broadway cast.

Since 2021, he has been part of the supporting cast of the Peacock show Girls5Eva.

Personal life 
Breaker has been married to theatre director Kate Whoriskey since 2008. They have two children.

Stage credits

Filmography

Film

Television

References

External links 
 
 
 

1980 births
21st-century American comedians
21st-century American male actors
African-American male actors
American male comedians
American male film actors
American male musical theatre actors
American male stage actors
American male television actors
Living people
Male actors from Kansas
People from Manhattan, Kansas
Theatre World Award winners
20th-century African-American male singers
21st-century African-American people